Perfect thermal contact of the surface of a solid with the environment (convective heat transfer) or another solid occurs when the temperatures of the mating surfaces are equal.

Perfect thermal contact conditions 

Perfect thermal contact supposes that on the boundary surface  there holds an equality of the temperatures

and an equality of heat fluxes

where  are temperatures of the solid and environment (or mating solid), respectively;  are thermal conductivity coefficients of the solid and mating laminar layer (or solid), respectively;  is normal to the surface .

If there is a heat source on the boundary surface , e.g. caused by sliding friction, the latter equality transforms in the following manner

where  is heat-generation rate per unit area.

References 

 H. S. Carslaw, J. C. Jaeger (1959). Conduction of heat in solids. Oxford: Clarendon Press.
 M. Shillor, M. Sofonea, J. J. Telega (2004). Models and analysis of quasistatic contact. Variational methods. Berlin: Springer.

Heat transfer
Boundary conditions